A trow (also trowe, drow, or dtrow) is a malignant or mischievous fairy or spirit in the folkloric traditions of the Orkney and Shetland islands. Trows are small, approximately three or three and a half feet tall, and they predominantly dress in grey.

Trows are not to be confused with trolls.   

In Shetland trows are also known as “Hill-folk”.

Trows are nocturnal creatures. They venture out of their 'trowie knowes' (earthen mound dwellings) solely in the evening, and often enter households as the inhabitants sleep. Trows traditionally have a fondness for music, and folktales tell of their habit of kidnapping musicians or luring them to their dens.

Terminology 
The trow , in the Scots dialect, is defined as a ‘sprite or fairy’ of mischievous nature in dictionaries of Scots, particularly Orkney and Shetland dialects.

Etymology 
As an alternate etymology, John Jamieson's Scottish dictionary conjectured that the word trow may be a corruption of Scandinavian draug. It may be worth noting that the Norwegian "sea-draug" was either a sub-type or equivalent to the sea-troll/sea-trold, according to 18th century tracts by Dano-Norwegians.

drow 
The trow is also called drow under its variant spelling in the Scots dialect; the "drow" being mentioned by Walter Scott. However, the term "drow" could also be used in the sense of ‘the devil’ in Orkney.

The word drow also occurs in the Shetland Norn language, where it means ‘huldrefolk’("the hidden people", fairies), ‘troll-folk’, or ‘ghost’. As drow is obviously not a Norse language spelling, linguist Jakob Jakobsen proposed it was taken from the common (Scots) term "trow" altered to drow by assimilation with Old Norse  or Norwegian . The reconstructed Shetland word would be *drog if it did descend from Old Norse draugr, but this is unattested, nor was it adopted into the Nynorn vocabulary to supersede the known form.

General description 

The trows were one of the matters on which a taboo was imposed on speaking about them. It was also considered unlucky to catch sight of a trow, though auspicious to hear one speaking.

Their portrayed appearance can vary greatly: in some telling gigantic and even multi-headed, as are some giants in English lore; else small or human-sized, like ordinary fairies, but dressed in grey.

Trows consist of two kinds, the hill-trows (land trows) and sea-trows, and the two kinds are professed to be mortal enemies.

Of the hill-dwelling types, it is said they can only appear out of their dwellings ("knowes"=knolls; "trowie knowes") after sunset, and if they miss the opportunity to return before sunrise, they do not perish but must await above ground and bide his time until "the Glüder (the sun) disappears again".

The trows are fond of music and constantly play the fiddle themselves. Sometimes a human learns such tunes, and there are traditional tunes purported to have been learned from the supernatural creatures (cf. §Trowie tunes below).

Tales are also told of human fiddlers being abducted by trows to their mounds, and although released after what seems a brief stay, many long years have elapsed in the outside world, and the victim turns to dust, or chooses to die.

Sea-trow 

There are varying descriptions concerning the sea-trow.

An early account is that of the trow of Stronsay, as described by Jo. Ben (i.e., John or Joseph Ben)'s Description of the Orkney Islands (1529); it was a maritime monster resembling a colt whose entire body was cloaked in seaweed, with a coiled or matted coat of hair, sexual organs like a horse's, and known to engage in sexual intercourse {{efn|concubuit, coeunt "copulate"}} with the women of the island.

The sea-trow of Orkney is "the ugliest imaginable" according to W. Traill Dennison, who says that it has been represented as a scaly creature with matted hair, having monkey-like face and sloping head.  It was said to be frail-bodied with disproportionately huge sets of limbs, disc-shaped feet ("round as a millstone") with webbings on their hands and feet, causing them to move with a lumbering and "wabbling" slow gait.

However in Shetland, "da mokkl sea-trow", a great evil spirit that dwelled in the depths, was said to take on the shape of a woman, at least in some instances.

It is blamed for awaiting in the depths and stealing from the fish caught on fishermen's lines, and otherwise feared for causing storms or causing ill luck to fishermen. In the form of the wailing woman, she portends some misfortune befalling the witness/audience.

According to Samuel Hibbert the sea-trow was a local version of the neckar, and he specified that it was reputed to be decked with various stuff from out of the sea, especially fuci (Fucus spp. of seaweed), whose larger forms near shore are known as "tang" in Shetland. And though Hibbert does not make the connection, E. Marwick equated the sea-trow with the "tangy", as already noted.

 Landmarks 

Most mounds in Orkney are associated with "mound-dweller[s]" (hogboon;) living inside them, and though local lore does always specify, the dweller is commonly the trow.

A reputedly trow-haunted mound may not in fact be a burial mound. The Long Howe in Tankerness, a glacial mound, was believed to contain trows, and thus avoided after dark. A group of mounds around Trowie Glen in Hoy are also geological formations, but feared for its trows throughout the valley, and also unapproached after dark.

The stone circle on Fetlar has been dubbed the Haltadans (meaning ‘Limping Dance’) since according to legend, they represent a group of petrified music-loving trows who were so engrossed by dancing to the trowie fiddler's tunes that they failed to hide before dawn's break.

On the mainland in Canisbay, Caithness is a "Mire of Trowskerry" associated with trows.

 Trowie tunes 
Some Shetland fiddle tunes are said to have come to human fiddlers when they heard the trows playing, and are known as "Trowie Tunes". apud  A selection is offered in the anthology Da Mirrie Dancers (1985).

"Da Trølla Knowe" ('The Knoll of the Trolls') is one example. "Da Trowie Burn" is also an alleged trowie tune, though its composition is attributed to Friedemann Stickle. This apparent contradiction is resolved in the case of "Da Trow's Reel", which was allegedly a tune that another man reputedly obtained from a trow, and he had whistled the tune over to Stickle on a different boat for him to set down the score. "Da Peerie Hoose in under da Hill" ('The Little House under the Hill') is yet another trowie tune as well.

Another trowie tune "Winyadepla", performed by Tom Anderson on his album with Aly Bain, The Silver Bow.

 Kunal trows 

A Kunal-Trow (or King-Trow) is a type of trow in the lore of Unst, Shetland. The Kunal-Trow is alleged to be a race without females, and said to wander after dark and sometimes found weeping due to the lack of companionship. But they do take human wife, once in their lives, and she invariably dies after giving birth to a son. The Kunal-Trow would subsequently require the service of a human wet-nurse, and may abduct a midwife for this purpose. [1975], "Ch. 2: Folk of Hill and Mound", 

They are said to consume earth formed into shapes of fish and fowl, even babies, which taste and smell like the real thing.

One (a King-Trow) famously haunted a broch ruin. Another married a witch who extracted all the trow's secrets, and gave birth to Ganfer (astral body) and Finis (an apparition who appears in the guise of someone whose death is imminent), yet she has cheated death with her arts.

 Parallels 
Ben's sea-trow (trowis) bore resemblance to the anciently known incubus, as it "seems to have occupied the visions of the female sex", as noted by John Graham Dalyell (1835).

The learning of music from fairies is recognized as a recurring theme in Scandinavian and Celtic folklore. Examples in Irish tradition relate how a lutharachán (dialect form of leprechaun) or púca teaches tunes, like the Shetlandic trow who lets his music be heard from his fairy mound or otherwise; such tales classifiable as Migratory Legends "Type 4091, Music Taught by Fairie (Fiddle on the Wall)" under Bo Almqvist's modified system

The tale of a fiddler being taken to a fairy mound by fairies or trows is known by several versions in Shetland, but has also been collected from Orkney and the Scottish mainland (Inverness), and the group is assigned "F24. Fiddler Enlisted to Play for Fairy Dancers" under Alan Bruford's provisional classification scheme.

 Origins 

Book author Joan Dey (1991) speculates that the tradition concerning the trows may be based in part on the Norse arrival in Shetland and orkney.  She states that the conquest by the Vikings sent the indigenous, dark-haired Picts into hiding and that "many stories exist in Shetland of these strange people, smaller and darker than the tall, blond Vikings who, having been driven off their land into sea-caves, emerged at night to steal from the new land owners".

Shetland folklore spoke of the presence of the Pechs (mythologized version of the Picts) inside the fairy knolls ("trowie knowe"), who could be heard clinking their tools on silver and gold.

 See also 

 Dark elf (disambiguation)
 Drow (Dungeons & Dragons)
 Goblin
 Kobold
 Leprechaun
 Sprite

 Explanatory notes 

 References 
 Notes 

 Citations 

Bibliography

  (U.S. version of A Dictionary of Fairies'', London: Penguin. 1976)
 

 
  pp. 205–208, 233–234, and 263†.

External links
 Orkneyjar.com

Scottish folklore
Scottish legendary creatures
Orcadian culture
Shetland culture
Goblins
Elves
Trolls